The Black Meteor is a 2000 Dutch film directed by Guido Pieters. The film is based on the novel by Tom Egbers, a Dutch sports journalist, which was adapted for the screen by Kees van Beijnum. The novel fictionalizes the story of Steve Mokone, the first black player to play in a professional European league.

Plot
The movie is set in the 1950s, when soccer club SC Heracles from Almelo, in the rural east of the Netherlands, acquires an African player. Steve Mokone makes Heracles a successful team, while changing every aspect of life in the small city. Mokone builds a unique friendship with the 15-year-old Felix, but then leaves town as quickly as he came.

Reception
Scott Foundas, writing for Variety, was not overly positive, criticizing its "holier-than-thou coming of age/race relations" quality.

Cast
Jet Novuka - Steve Mokone
Erik van der Horst - Felix Verbeek
Gijs Scholten van Aschat - Schouten, Heracles chairman
Peter Tuinman - Felix's father
Lieneke le Roux - Felix's mother
Thekla Reuten - Vera
Roef Ragas - Jaap Stegehuis
Caro Lenssen - Mies
Angelique de Bruijne - neighbor
Aus Greidanus - Heracles coach 
Wouter van Oord - Tim
Guus de Wit - Jan
Benten Wijnen - Jan (as Benten Bastiaan Wijnen)
Jop Kappelhoff - Koen
Frederik Brom - Rooie Gaait (as Freek Brom)

References

External links 
 

2000 films
2000s Dutch-language films
Films set in the 1950s
Dutch association football films
Films set in the Netherlands
2000s sports films
Films directed by Guido Pieters